The following is an incomplete list of starting quarterbacks for the Calgary Stampeders of the Canadian Football League that have started a regular season game for the team. They are listed in order of appearance during the regular season or post-season, since 1990. Prior years do not include post-season starts and list number of starts from greatest to fewest.

Starting quarterbacks by season

Where known, the number of games they started during the season is listed to the right:

References
 CFL Record Book 2017
 Stats Crew Calgary Stampeders
 CFLapedia

Calgary Stampeders
Starting quarterbacks